was a Japanese actor who appeared in over 150 feature films. He is best known for his 16-film collaboration (1948–1965) with Akira Kurosawa in such works as Rashomon, Seven Samurai, The Hidden Fortress, Throne of Blood, and Yojimbo. He also portrayed Miyamoto Musashi in Hiroshi Inagaki's Samurai Trilogy and one earlier Inagaki film, Lord Toranaga in the NBC television miniseries Shōgun, and Admiral Isoroku Yamamoto in three different films.

Early life

Toshiro Mifune was born on April 1, 1920 in Seitō, Japanese-occupied Shandong (present-day Qingdao, China), the eldest son of Tokuzo and Sen Mifune. His father Tokuzo was a trade merchant and photographer who ran a photography business in Qingdao and Yingkou, and was originally the son of a medical doctor from Kawauchi, Akita Prefecture. His mother Sen was the daughter of a hatamoto, a high-ranking samurai official. Toshiro's parents, who were working as Methodist missionaries, were some of the Japanese citizens encouraged to live in Shandong by the Japanese government during its occupation before the Republic of China took over the city in 1922. Mifune grew up with his parents and two younger siblings in Dalian, Fengtian from the age of 4 to 19. 

In his youth, Mifune worked at his father's photo studio. After spending the first 19 years of his life in China, as a Japanese citizen, he was drafted into the Imperial Japanese Army Aviation division, where he served in the Aerial Photography unit during World War II.

Early work
In 1947, a large number of Toho actors, after a prolonged strike, had left to form their own company, Shin Toho. Toho then organized a "new faces" contest to find new talent. 

Nenji Oyama, a friend of Mifune's who worked for the Photography Department of Toho Productions, sent Mifune's resume to the New Faces audition as the Photography Department was full, telling Mifune he could later transfer to the Photography Department if he wished. He was accepted, along with 48 others (out of roughly 4,000 applicants), and allowed to take a screen test for Kajirō Yamamoto. Instructed to mime anger, he drew from his wartime experiences. Yamamoto took a liking to Mifune, recommending him to director Senkichi Taniguchi. This led to Mifune's first feature role, in Shin Baka Jidai.

Mifune first encountered director Akira Kurosawa when Toho Studios, the largest film production company in Japan, was conducting a massive talent search, during which hundreds of aspiring actors auditioned before a team of judges. Kurosawa was originally going to skip the event, but showed up when Hideko Takamine told him of one actor who seemed especially promising. Kurosawa later wrote that he entered the audition to see "a young man reeling around the room in a violent frenzy ... it was as frightening as watching a wounded beast trying to break loose. I was transfixed." When Mifune, exhausted, finished his scene, he sat down and gave the judges an ominous stare. He lost the competition but Kurosawa was impressed. "I am a person rarely impressed by actors," he later said. "But in the case of Mifune I was completely overwhelmed." Mifune immersed himself into the six-month training and diligently applied himself to studying acting, although at first he still hoped to be transferred to the camera department.

Marriage 
Among Mifune's fellow performers, one of the 32 women chosen during the new faces contest was Sachiko Yoshimine.  Eight years Mifune's junior, she came from a respected Tokyo family. They fell in love and Mifune soon proposed marriage.

Director Senkichi Taniguchi, with the help of Akira Kurosawa, convinced the Yoshimine family to allow the marriage. The wedding took place in February 1950 at the Aoyama Gakuin Methodist Church. Yoshimine was a Buddhist but since Mifune was a Christian, they were married in church as per Christian tradition.

In November of the same year, their first son, Shirō was born. In 1955, they had a second son, Takeshi. Mifune's daughter  was born to his mistress, actress Mika Kitagawa, in 1982.

Period of prosperity

His imposing bearing, acting range, facility with foreign languages and lengthy partnership with acclaimed director Akira Kurosawa made him the most famous Japanese actor of his time, and easily the best known to Western audiences. He often portrayed samurai or rōnin who were usually coarse and gruff (Kurosawa once explained that the only weakness he could find with Mifune and his acting ability was his "rough" voice), inverting the popular stereotype of the genteel, clean-cut samurai. In such films as Seven Samurai and Yojimbo, he played characters who were often comically lacking in manners, but replete with practical wisdom and experience, understated nobility, and, in the case of Yojimbo, unmatched fighting prowess. Sanjuro in particular contrasts this earthy warrior spirit with the useless, sheltered propriety of the court samurai. Kurosawa valued Mifune highly for his effortless portrayal of unvarnished emotion, once commenting that he could convey in only three feet of film an emotion for which the average Japanese actor would require ten feet.

He was also known for the effort he put into his performances. To prepare for Seven Samurai and Rashomon, Mifune reportedly studied footage of lions in the wild. For the Mexican film Ánimas Trujano, he studied tapes of Mexican actors speaking so that he could recite all of his lines in Spanish. Many Mexicans believed that Toshiro Mifune could have passed for a native of Oaxaca due to his critically acclaimed performance. When asked why he chose Mexico to do his next film, Mifune quoted, “Simply because, first of all, Mr. Ismael Rodríguez convinced me; secondly, because I was eager to work in beautiful Mexico, of great tradition; and thirdly, because the story and character of 'Animas Trujano' seemed very human to me”. The film was nominated for both a Golden Globe and an Oscar. Interestingly, Mifune gave a Japanese pistol as a gift to then-Mexican president Adolfo López Mateos when they met in Oaxaca.

Mifune has been credited as originating the "roving warrior" archetype, which he perfected during his collaboration with Kurosawa. His martial arts instructor was Yoshio Sugino of the Tenshin Shōden Katori Shintō-ryū. Sugino created the fight choreography for films such as Seven Samurai and Yojimbo, and Kurosawa instructed his actors to emulate his movements and bearing.

Clint Eastwood was among the first of many actors to adopt this wandering ronin with no name persona for foreign films, which he used to great effect in his Western roles, especially in Spaghetti Westerns directed by Sergio Leone where he played the Man with No Name, a character similar to Mifune's seemingly-nameless ronin in Yojimbo.

Mifune may also be credited with originating the Yakuza archetype, with his performance as a mobster in Kurosawa's Drunken Angel (1948), the first Yakuza film. Most of the sixteen Kurosawa–Mifune films are considered cinema classics. These include Drunken Angel, Stray Dog, Rashomon, Seven Samurai, The Hidden Fortress, High and Low, Throne of Blood (an adaptation of Shakespeare's Macbeth), Yojimbo, and Sanjuro.

Mifune and Kurosawa finally parted ways after Red Beard. Several factors contributed to the rift that ended this career-spanning collaboration. Mifune had a passion for film in his own right and had long wanted to set up a production company, working towards going freelance. Kurosawa and Taniguchi advised against it out of concern they would not be able to cast Mifune as freely. Most of Mifune's contemporaries acted in several different movies in this period. Since Red Beard required Mifune to grow a natural beard — one he had to keep for the entirety of the film's two years of shooting — he was unable to act in any other films during the production. This put Mifune and his financially strapped production company deeply into debt, creating friction between him and Kurosawa. Although Red Beard played to packed houses in Japan and Europe, which helped Mifune recoup some of his losses, the ensuing years held varying outcomes for both Mifune and Kurosawa. After the film's release, the careers of each man took different arcs: Mifune continued to enjoy success with a range of samurai and war-themed films (Rebellion, Samurai Assassin, The Emperor and a General, among others). In contrast, Kurosawa's output of films dwindled and drew mixed responses. During this time, Kurosawa attempted suicide. In 1980, Mifune experienced popularity with mainstream American audiences through his role as Lord Toranaga in the television miniseries Shogun. Yet Kurosawa did not rejoice in his estranged friend's success, and publicly made derisive remarks about Shogun. In contrast, Mifune spoke respectfully of Kurosawa and loyally attended the premiere of Kagemusha.

Mifune turned down an opportunity from United Artists to play the Japanese spy chief Tiger Tanaka in the James Bond film You Only Live Twice (1967). According to his daughter, he also turned down an offer from George Lucas to play either Darth Vader or Obi-Wan Kenobi in Star Wars (1977).

Mifune himself was always professional, memorizing all of his lines and not carrying scripts on set. He was unusually humble for an international star, and was known for treating his costars and crew very generously, throwing lavish catered parties for them and paying for their families to go to onsen resorts.

Later life and death 
In 1979, Mifune joined the ensemble cast of the Steven Spielberg war comedy 1941 as the commander of a lost Imperial Japanese Navy submarine searching for Hollywood shortly after the Pearl Harbor attack. Mifune received wide acclaim in the West after playing Toranaga in the 1980 TV miniseries Shogun. However, the series' blunt portrayal of the Tokugawa Shogunate and the greatly abridged version shown in Japan meant that it was not as well-received in his homeland.

The relationship between Kurosawa and Mifune remained ambivalent. Kurosawa criticized Mifune's acting in Interview magazine and also said that "All the films that I made with Mifune, without him, they would not exist". He also presented Mifune with the Kawashita award which he himself had won two years prior. They frequently encountered each other professionally and met again in 1993 at the funeral of their friend Ishirō Honda, but never collaborated again.

In 1992, Mifune began suffering from a serious unknown health problem. It has been variously suggested that he destroyed his health with overwork, suffered a heart attack, or experienced a stroke. He retreated from public life and remained largely confined to his home, cared for by his estranged wife Sachiko. When she died from pancreatic cancer in 1995, Mifune's physical and mental state declined rapidly.

On December 24, 1997, he died in Mitaka, Tokyo, of multiple organ failure at the age of 77.

Honors 
Mifune won the Volpi Cup for Best Actor twice, in 1961 and 1965. Mifune was awarded the Medal of Honor with Purple Ribbon in 1986 and the Order of the Sacred Treasure by the Japanese government in 1993. In 1973 he was a member of the jury at the 8th Moscow International Film Festival. In 1977 he was a member of the jury at the 10th Moscow International Film Festival.

On November 14, 2016, Mifune received a star on the Hollywood Walk of Fame for his work in the motion pictures industry, located at 6912 Hollywood Boulevard.

Personal quotations 
Of Akira Kurosawa, Toshiro Mifune said, "I have never as an actor done anything that I am proud of other than with him".
"Since I came into the industry very inexperienced, I don't have any theory of acting. I just had to play my roles my way."

"Generally speaking, most East–West stories have been a series of cliches. I, for one, have no desire to retell Madame Butterfly."

"An actor is not a puppet with strings pulled by the director. He is a human being with seeds of all emotions, desires, and needs within himself. I attempt to find the very center of this humanity and explore and experiment."

Filmography 
In 2015, Steven Okazaki released Mifune: The Last Samurai, a documentary  chronicling Mifune's life and career. Due to variations in translation from the Japanese and other factors, there are multiple titles to many of Mifune's films (see IMDB link). The titles shown here are the most common ones used in the United States, with the original Japanese title listed below it in parentheses. Mifune's filmography mainly consists of Japanese productions, unless noted otherwise (see Notes column).

Films 

The 1999 Danish film Mifune is named after the actor.

Television 
All programs originally aired in Japan except for Shōgun which aired in the U.S. on NBC in September 1980 before being subsequently broadcast in Japan on TV Asahi from March 30 to April 6, 1981.

Notes

References

Sources

External links 

English
 Toshiro Mifune: Biographical details and selected filmography at the British Film Institute
 
 Toshiro Mifune interview by Gerald Peary on The Globe and Mail, 6 June 1986

Japanese
 
 

1920 births
1997 deaths
20th-century Japanese male actors
Deaths from multiple organ failure
Chinese expatriates in Japan
Japanese male film actors
Japanese male television actors
Japanese Methodists
Imperial Japanese Army personnel of World War II
Japanese people from Manchukuo
Male actors from Dalian
Male actors from Qingdao
Recipients of the Medal with Purple Ribbon
Recipients of the Order of the Sacred Treasure, 3rd class
Volpi Cup for Best Actor winners
Imperial Japanese Army soldiers
Japanese expatriates in China